Alphonse Girandy (January 21, 1868 – April 3, 1941) was a United States Navy sailor and a recipient of America's highest military decoration, the Medal of Honor.

Biography
Girandy, of Pennsylvania, joined the Navy and served during the Spanish–American War in 1898. On March 31, 1901, he was working as a Seaman on the  when a fire broke out on the ship. For his actions on that occasion, Seaman Girandy was awarded the Medal of Honor one year later, on March 22, 1902. His official Medal of Honor citation reads: "Serving on board the U.S.S. Petrel, for heroism and gallantry, fearlessly exposing his own life to danger for the saving of others, on the occasion of the fire on board that vessel, March 31, 1901." He continued to serve in the Navy into World War I.

Girandy died at age 73 and was buried in Philadelphia National Cemetery, Philadelphia, Pennsylvania.

Awards
Medal of Honor
Good Conduct Medal
Spanish Campaign Medal
Philippine Campaign Medal
World War I Victory Medal

Medal of Honor citation
Rank and organization: Seaman, U.S. Navy. Born: January 21, 1868, Guadeloupe, West Indies. Accredited to: Pennsylvania. G.O. No.: 85, March 22, 1902.

Citation:

Serving on board the U.S.S. Petrel, for heroism and gallantry, fearlessly exposing his own life to danger for the saving of others, on the occasion of the fire on board that vessel, March 31, 1901.

See also

List of Medal of Honor recipients during Peacetime
List of African American Medal of Honor recipients

References

1868 births
1941 deaths
French emigrants to the United States
United States Navy Medal of Honor recipients
United States Navy sailors
Foreign-born Medal of Honor recipients
Non-combat recipients of the Medal of Honor
Guadeloupean people
United States Navy personnel of World War I